Patrick J. Hearden (born September 17, 1942) is the Professor of History at Purdue University, West Lafayette, Indiana.  He specializes in the history of American foreign policy.  He received a Ph.D. degree from the University of Wisconsin-Madison in 1971

Published works
Architects of Globalism:  Building a New World Order During World War II,  Fayetteville:  The University of Arkansas Press, 2002.
The Tragedy of Vietnam, New York: Pearson Longman, 1991.
Roosevelt Confronts Hitler: America’s Entry into World War II,  DeKalb: Northern Illinois University Press, 1987.
Independence and Empire: The New South’s Cotton Mill Campaign, 1865-1901, DeKalb: Northern Illinois University Press, 1982.

References

Living people
University of Wisconsin–Madison alumni
Cold War historians
1942 births
Historians of American foreign relations
21st-century American historians
21st-century American male writers
American male non-fiction writers